Wang Yucheng (or Yu-Ch'eng) (王禹偁, 954–1001) was a Chinese poet from Juye in the Shandong province.  He served in a government post and was known for forthright criticism of policies; this led to his eventual banishment to the South.

Song dynasty poets
954 births
1001 deaths
Writers from Heze
Poets from Shandong
10th-century Chinese poets
11th-century Chinese poets
10th-century Chinese historians
Historians from Shandong
Song dynasty essayists